Charlotte, comtesse d'Issoudun (13 July 1808 – 13 July 1886) was a French noblewoman, daughter of Prince Charles Ferdinand, Duke of Berry and Amy Brown.

Biography 
Charlotte was born on 13 July 1808. Her parents had met in the fall of the previous year during performances at the London Royal Opera House. After the relationship between her parents, her sister Louise would be born. On 30 November 1809, she was baptized in Her Majesty's Catholic Chapel in London.

As a consequence of the Bourbon Restoration in France, Amy Brown settled in Paris with her two daughters. On 20 February 1820, her father was the victim of an attack at the Parisian opera, being mortally wounded with a dagger by Louvel. That night, on his deathbed, he reveals to his wife, Marie Caroline of the Two-Siciles (with whom he had married in 1816 and a daughter, Louise) the existence of his two daughters with Amy Brown. His daughters went to the opera to say goodbye to their dying father and were welcomed by the Duchess de Berry, who declared that she will welcome them as daughters and watch over them. After their father's death, they lived under the protection of the French Royal family. On 9 June 1820, her great-uncle, Louis XVIII, granted her French citizenship and the following day, the title of Countess of Issoudun and her own coat of arms. In the same days her sister was also granted French citizenship and was ennobled with the title of Countess of Vierzon. The monarch will also personally pension each of the sisters.

They maintain a relationship with their father's children, Louise and Henri, Duke of Bordeaux, accompanying them at their games at the Château de Bagatelle, even having their own apartments in the château de Rosny-sur Seine, owned by the Dowager Duchess of Berry.

On the 1st October 1823 in the parisian church of Saint Louis-d'Antin, she married Ferdinand, Count (later Prince) of Faucigny-Lucinge, military officer. They had five children:

 Charles (1824–1910),
 Louis (1828–1907),
 Henri (1831–1899),
 Marguerite (1833–1921) and
 René (1841–1911).

She died in 1886 at her family villa near Turin.

Sources

Notes

References 

1808 births
1886 deaths
House of Bourbon (France)